General elections were held in Liberia on 11 October 2005, with a runoff election for the presidency held on 8 November. The presidency and all seats in the House of Representatives and Senate were up for election. The elections were the first held since 1997 and marked the end of the political transition following the second civil war, having been stipulated in the Accra Comprehensive Peace Agreement of 2004. Ellen Johnson Sirleaf, former World Bank employee and Liberian finance minister, won the presidential contest and became the first democratically elected female African head of state in January 2006.

Background
Frances Johnson-Morris, the chairwoman of the National Elections Commission (NEC), announced the October 11 date on February 7, 2005.

Elections were scheduled for all 64 seats in the House of Representatives, with each of Liberia's 15 counties having at least two seats and the remaining seats allotted proportionally based on voter registration. The Senate had 30 seats up for elections, with two from each county.

Presidential candidates
Prior to the election, former football star George Weah was considered by many to be the favorite, due at least partially to widespread dissatisfaction with Liberia's politicians.  Weah, who had been the subject of a petition published in September 2004 urging him to run, announced his candidacy in mid-November 2004 and received a hero's welcome when he arrived in Monrovia later in the month.  Weah won the first round of voting but lost in the November 8, 2005 run-off.  He initially filed formal fraud charges, but subsequently dropped his allegations, citing the interests of peace.

Nathaniel Barnes — Liberia Destiny Party (LDP)
Charles Brumskine — Liberty Party (LP)
Sekou Conneh — Progressive Democratic Party (PRODEM)
Samuel Raymond Divine — Independent
David Farhat — Free Democratic Party (FDP)
Armah Jallah — National Party of Liberia (NPL)
Ellen Johnson Sirleaf — Unity Party (UP)
George Kiadii — National Vision Party of Liberia (NATVIPOL)
George Klay Kieh — New Deal Movement (NDM)
Joseph Korto — Liberia Equal Rights Party (LERP)
Robert Kpoto — Union of Liberian Democrats (ULD)
Alhaji G.V. Kromah — All Liberia Coalition Party (ALCOP)
Roland Massaquoi — National Patriotic Party (NPP)
John Morlu — United Democratic Alliance (UDA)
Alfred Reeves — National Reformation Party (NRP)
Varney Sherman — Coalition for the Transformation of Liberia (COTOL)
Togba-Nah Tipoteh — Alliance for Peace and Democracy (APD)
Margaret Tor-Thompson — Freedom Alliance Party of Liberia (FAPL)
Winston Tubman — National Democratic Party of Liberia (NDPL)
William V.S. Tubman, Jr. — Reformed United Liberia Party (RULP)
George Weah — Congress for Democratic Change (CDC)
Joseph Woah-Tee — Labor Party of Liberia (LPL)

Excluded candidates
The chairman of the transitional government, Gyude Bryant, and other members of the transitional government did not run, according to the terms of the peace deal.

On August 13, the election commission published a list of 22 presidential candidates who were cleared to run; six candidates were rejected, but Weah was cleared to stand despite complaints that he had adopted French citizenship. The Senate seats were contested by 206 candidates and the seats in the lower house were contested by 503 candidates.  Campaigning for the elections began on August 15.

In late September, the Supreme Court ruled that two excluded presidential candidates, Marcus Jones and Cornelius Hunter, and an excluded legislative candidate could register to run; this ruling created the possibility that the elections would have to be postponed in order to reprint ballot papers. However, these candidates later withdrew their bids, so the elections went ahead on schedule on October 11.

Results

President
Voting took place in two rounds 11 October and 8 November. Twenty-two people contested the presidential race in the first round. George Weah, former soccer star and Ellen Johnson Sirleaf, former World Bank employee and finance minister finished first and second, respectively and advanced to the second round run-off, which Johnson-Sirleaf won 59%-41%, according to the National Electoral Commission.

Weah claimed election fraud, stating elections officials were stuffing ballot boxes in Johnson-Sirleaf's favor. Most elections observers, including those from the United Nations, the European Union and the Economic Community of West African States, say that the election was clean and transparent.  The Carter Center observed "minor irregularities" but no major problems. Johnson-Sirleaf reminded the press that Weah has 72 hours to bring evidence of wrongdoing to her campaign according to Liberian law, calling the accusations "lies" and stating that Weah's supporters "just don't want a woman to be President in Africa."

On December 22, 2005, Weah withdrew his protests, and in January, Ellen Johnson Sirleaf became the first democratically elected female Head of State in the history of the African Continent, and the first native female African head of state since Empress Zauditu, who ruled Ethiopia from 1916 to 1930.

House of Representatives

Senate
As no Senate existed prior to the elections, each voter was eligible to cast two ballots for different candidates. The two candidates with the highest number of votes in each county were elected. The candidate with the highest share of votes became the senior senator for the county, elected to a nine-year term. The candidate with the second-highest share became the junior senator, elected to a six-year term. This method was chosen in order to reintroduce a staggered electoral system.

References

External links

General information
National Elections Commission
Liberia 2005: The Road to Democracy
United Nations Mission in Liberia (UNMIL) Electoral Division
United Liberia - Latest News
Press Freedom Conditions in Liberia - IFEX
All Africa, Liberia news

Candidates
Nat Barnes for President
Charles Brumskine Campaign Site
Samuel Raymond Divine Campaign Site
John Morlu for President
Varney Sherman for President
Dr. Togba-Nah Tipoteh for President
Winston Tubman Campaign Site
George Weah Campaign Site

Articles
I am woman, hear my roar Katharine Houreld on the participation of women in the 2005 Liberian election.

Liberia
General election
Elections in Liberia
Liberia
Liberia
Election and referendum articles with incomplete results